This article provides information on candidates who stood for the 1980 Australian federal election. The election was held on 18 October 1980.

Redistributions and seat changes
A redistribution of electoral boundaries occurred in Western Australia.
A new seat, the notionally Liberal O'Connor, was created.
Tasmanian Senator Ken Wriedt (Labor) resigned from the Senate to contest Denison.

Retiring Members and Senators

Labor
 Gordon Bryant MP (Wills, Vic)
 Clyde Cameron MP (Hindmarsh, SA)
 John FitzPatrick MP (Riverina, NSW)
 Bert James MP (Hunter, NSW)
 Keith Johnson MP (Burke, Vic)
 Vince Martin MP (Banks, NSW)
Senator Reg Bishop (SA)
Senator Jim Cavanagh (SA)
Senator Ron McAuliffe (Qld)
Senator Justin O'Byrne (Tas)
Senator John Wheeldon (WA)

Liberal
 Bill Graham MP (North Sydney, NSW)
 Tony Staley MP (Chisholm, Vic)
Senator Gordon Davidson (SA)
Senator Sir Condor Laucke (SA)
Senator Peter Sim (WA)

National Country
 James Corbett MP (Maranoa, Qld)
 Philip Lucock MP (Lyne, NSW)

Country Liberal
 Sam Calder MP (Northern Territory, NT)

House of Representatives
Sitting members at the time of the election are shown in bold text. Successful candidates are highlighted in the relevant colour. Where there is possible confusion, an asterisk (*) is also used.

Australian Capital Territory

New South Wales

Northern Territory

Queensland

South Australia

Tasmania

Victoria

Western Australia

Senate
Sitting Senators are shown in bold text. Tickets that elected at least one Senator are highlighted in the relevant colour. Successful candidates are identified by an asterisk (*).

Australian Capital Territory
Two seats were up for election. The Labor Party was defending one seat. The Liberal Party was defending one seat.

New South Wales
Five seats were up for election. The Labor Party was defending two seats. The Liberal-NCP Coalition was defending three seats. Senators Peter Baume (Liberal), Arthur Gietzelt (Labor), Misha Lajovic (Liberal), Colin Mason (Democrats) and Tony Mulvihill (Labor) were not up for re-election.

Northern Territory
Two seats were up for election. The Labor Party was defending one seat. The Country Liberal Party was defending one seat.

Queensland
Five seats were up for election. The Labor Party was defending two seats. The Liberal Party was defending one seat. The National Party of Australia was defending two seats. Senators Stan Collard (National Country), Mal Colston (Labor), George Georges (Labor), David MacGibbon (Liberal) and Kathy Martin (Liberal) were not up for re-election.

South Australia
Five seats were up for election. The Labor Party was defending two seats. The Liberal Party was defending three seats. Senators Ron Elstob (Labor), Geoff McLaren (Labor), Tony Messner (Liberal), Baden Teague (Liberal) and Harold Young (Liberal) were not up for re-election.

Tasmania
Five seats were up for election. The Labor Party was defending two seats. The Liberal Party was defending two seats. Independent Senator Brian Harradine was defending one seat. Senators Brian Archer (Liberal), Don Grimes (Labor), Michael Tate (Labor), Shirley Walters (Liberal) and John Watson (Liberal) were not up for re-election.

Victoria
Five seats were up for election. The Labor Party was defending two seats. The Liberal Party was defending three seats. Senators John Button (Labor), Don Chipp (Democrats), Gareth Evans (Labor), David Hamer (Liberal) and Alan Missen (Liberal) were not up for re-election.

Western Australia
Five seats were up for election. The Labor Party was defending two seats. The Liberal Party was defending three seats. Senators Fred Chaney (Liberal), Ruth Coleman (Labor), Allan Rocher (Liberal), Andrew Thomas (Liberal) and Peter Walsh (Labor) were not up for re-election.

Summary by party 

Beside each party is the number of seats contested by that party in the House of Representatives for each state, as well as an indication of whether the party contested the Senate election in the respective state.

See also
 1980 Australian federal election
 Members of the Australian House of Representatives, 1977–1980
 Members of the Australian House of Representatives, 1980–1983
 Members of the Australian Senate, 1978–1981
 Members of the Australian Senate, 1981–1983
 List of political parties in Australia

References
Adam Carr's Election Archive - House of Representatives 1980
Adam Carr's Election Archive - Senate 1980

1980 in Australia
Candidates for Australian federal elections